Phalacromyrmex is a Neotropical genus of ants in the subfamily Myrmicinae. It contains the single species Phalacromyrmex fugax, first described from three workers collected in Ibicaré, Santa Catarina, Brazil.

References

External links

Myrmicinae
Monotypic ant genera
Hymenoptera of South America